The Tasmanian South East is an interim Australian bioregion located in the south-eastern region of Tasmania, comprising .

See also

 Ecoregions in Australia
 Interim Biogeographic Regionalisation for Australia
 Regions of Tasmania

References

Further reading
 

South East Tasmania
IBRA regions
Southern Tasmania
East Coast Tasmania